The 2021–22 season was Al-Raed's 68th year in their history and 14th consecutive season in the Pro League. The club participated in the Pro League and the King Cup.

The season covered the period from 1 July 2021 to 30 June 2022.

Players

Squad information

Out on loan

Transfers and loans

Transfers in

Loans in

Transfers out

Loans out

Pre-season

Competitions

Overview

Pro League

League table

Results summary

Results by round

Matches
All times are local, AST (UTC+3).

King Cup

All times are local, AST (UTC+3).

Statistics

Appearances

Last updated on 27 June 2022.

|-
! colspan=10 style=background:#dcdcdc; text-align:center|Goalkeepers

|-
! colspan=10 style=background:#dcdcdc; text-align:center|Defenders

|-
! colspan=10 style=background:#dcdcdc; text-align:center|Midfielders

|-
! colspan=10 style=background:#dcdcdc; text-align:center|Forwards

|-
! colspan=14 style=background:#dcdcdc; text-align:center| Players sent out on loan this season

|-
! colspan=18 style=background:#dcdcdc; text-align:center| Player who made an appearance this season but have left the club

|}

Goalscorers

Last Updated: 27 June 2022

Assists

Last Updated: 27 June 2022

Clean sheets

Last Updated: 27 June 2022

References

Al-Raed FC seasons
Raed